Pram or PRAM may refer to:

Places
 Pram, Austria, a municipality in the district of Grieskirchen in the Austrian state of Upper Austria
Dorf an der Pram, a municipality in the district of Schärding in the Austrian state of Upper Austria
Zell an der Pram, a municipality in the district of Schärding in the Austrian state of Upper Austria

People
Christen Pram (1756–1821), Norwegian/Danish economist, civil servant, poet, novelist, playwright, diarist and editor

Arts and entertainment
 Pram (band), a musical group
 The Pram Factory, an Australian alternative theatre venue in the Melbourne suburb of Carlton
 Pram, a character in the video game Makai Kingdom: Chronicles of the Sacred Tome

Science
 Parallel RAM, an abstract computer for designing parallel algorithms
 Phase-change RAM, a chalcogenide glass type of non-volatile random-access memory
 Parameter RAM, an area of non-volatile random-access memory used to store system settings on Apple's Macintosh computers
 PRAM1, or PML-RARA-regulated adapter molecule 1, a protein that in humans is encoded by the PRAM1 gene

Transportation
 Prams Air (Puerto Rico Air Management Services), an air charter and cargo operator, Miami International Airport, US
 Pram (boat), a small utility dinghy with a transom bow rather than a pointed bow
 Optimist (dinghy), with a pram hull
 Pram (ship), a type of shallow-draught, flat-bottomed ship (large watercraft)
 Pram (baby), a type of wheeled baby transport

Others
 Pram suit, a one-piece garment for infants, designed as cold-weather outerwear, and typically enclosing the entire body except for the face